Bennett Island is the largest of the De Long Islands in the northern part of the East Siberian Sea. Bennett Island is part of the Yakutia administrative division of Russia.

History 
Bennett Island was discovered by the wider world by USA explorer George W. De Long in 1881, and named after James Gordon Bennett Jr., who had financed the expedition. However, the ship entered an ice pack near Herald Island in September 1879, and became trapped. The vessel was crushed by the ice and sank in June 1881. At that point the party was forced to trek over the ice on foot, discovering Bennett Island during July 1881, and claiming it for the United States. They remained on the island for several days before setting out again for the New Siberian Islands and the mainland of Siberia.

In August 1901, Russian polar ship Zarya sailed on an expedition searching for the legendary Sannikov Land but was soon blocked by floating pack ice. During 1902 the attempts to reach Sannikov Land continued while Zarya was trapped in fast ice. Russian explorer Baron Eduard Toll and three companions vanished forever in November 1902 while travelling away from Bennett Island towards the south on loose ice floes.

In 1916, the Russian ambassador in London issued an official notice to the effect that the Imperial government considered Bennett, along with other Arctic islands, integral parts of the Russian Empire. This territorial claim was later maintained by the Soviet Union.

Some individuals assert American ownership of Bennett Island, and others of the De Long group, based on the 1881 landing. However, the United States government has never claimed Bennett Island, and recognizes it as Russian territory.

Geology 

Bennett Island consists of Early Paleozoic, late Cretaceous, Pliocene, and Quaternary sedimentary and igneous rocks. The oldest rocks outcropping on Bennett island are moderately tilted marine Cambrian to Ordovician sedimentary rocks. These Paleozoic rocks are overlain by Late Cretacecous coal-bearing argillites and quartzite-like sandstones and basaltic lava and tuff with lenses of tuffaceous argillite. The Late Cretaceous strata is overlain by basaltic lavas ranging in age from Pliocene to Quaternary. The Quaternary volcanic rocks form volcanic cones.

Climate
Little has been published about the climatology of Bennett Island in the English language literature.

Glaciers 

Bennett Island has the largest permanent ice cover within the De Long Islands. All of these glaciers were perched on high, basaltic plateaus bounded by steep scarp-like slopes.

In 1992, Dr. Verkulich and others named these glaciers as the De Long East, De Long West, Malyy, and Toll glaciers. It had an outlet glacier, West Seeberg Glacier, from which ice flowed downhill from Toll Glacier into the sea. In 1987, all of these glaciers were shrinking in volume and had been so for the past 40 years.

Of the glaciers described by Dr. Verkulich and others, Dr. Glazovskiy discusses only the Toll Ice Cap, which Dr. Verkulich and others referred to as "Toll Glacier". Its equilibrium line altitude was at an elevation of 200 m (660 ft) above sea level.

According to Alekseev, Anisimov and Tumskoy, and Makeyev and others, the glaciers found on Bennett and other islands of the De Long Islands are remnants of small passive ice caps formed during the Last Glacial Maximum (Late Weichselian Epoch) about 17,000 to 24,000 BP. At the time that these ice caps formed, the De Long Islands were major hills within a large subaerial plain, called the Great Arctic Plain, that now lies submerged below the Arctic Ocean and East Siberian Sea.

Vegetation 
Rush/grass, forb, cryptogam tundra covers the Bennett Island. It is tundra consisting mostly of very low-growing grasses, rushes, forbs, mosses, lichens, and liverworts. These plants either mostly or completely cover the surface of the ground. The soils are typically moist, fine-grained, and often hummocky.

Atmospheric plumes 

Bennett Island plumes are a phenomenon in the arctic that had been a mystery to atmospheric scientists for decades  until it was finally explained by a collaborative, post-cold war United States and Russian expedition in the 1990s. For years, scientists observed large, sometimes hundreds of miles long plumes emanating from the northeast coast of Russia over the remote Bennett Island and scientists hypothesized that the plumes were caused by volcanoes, gas plumes or even Soviet cold war testing before satellite observations revealed them to be meteorological in origin.

The most popular theory among scientists was that the plumes were formed when clathrates—methane, trapped and frozen into a crystalline structure similar to ice by a combination of low temperatures and high pressures—melted and released methane gas. These gas deposits can melt, bubble to the surface and erupt like a geyser into the atmosphere.

Due to remaining cold-war tensions, and the Soviet military's desire to protect the secrecy of submarine facilities, western scientists were only able to observe the plumes remotely via satellite. The melting permafrost/clathrate hypothesis was unable to be tested until spring of 1992, when US and Russian Scientists in Siberia were able to conduct an air-borne expedition conduct a sampling of the plume and surprisingly found no methane.

Scientists had initially dismissed the meteorological explanation of the clouds because the plumes only seemed to be unique to Bennett Island and not the other, similar islands, and because it was thought that the 1,000 foot high island was too low to generate orographic clouds. Orographic clouds normally form when air is forced to rise as it passes over a mountain and cools.

Bennett Island plumes form due to the layering of arctic air at different, very cold temperatures. The region is relatively remote, with only warmer polynyas—open water surrounded by sea ice – to potentially provide instability. The catalyst for the generation of the plumes was difficult to pinpoint because the apparent source region of the plume can appear to shift with time depending on the weakening or intensification of the strength of the wind flowing over the mountain. Consequently, the plumes were determined to be excellent indicators of the location of arctic fronts and jet stream activity.

Scientists are also studying the dynamics of the island, and why its unique shape is able to generate these plumes.

References

External links 
 

De Long Islands
Ice caps of Russia
Islands of the East Siberian Sea
Islands of the Sakha Republic